Rabnor Parish is a civil parish of King County, New South Wales. ).

References

Parishes of King County (New South Wales)
Upper Lachlan Shire